The 2014–15 Wisconsin Badgers women's basketball team represented the University of Wisconsin–Madison during the 2014–15 NCAA Division I women's basketball season. The Badgers, led by fourth year head coach Bobbie Kelsey, play their home games at the Kohl Center and were members of the Big Ten Conference. They finished the season 9–20, 5–13 in Big Ten play to finish in eleventh place. They lost in the first round of the Big Ten women's tournament to Purdue.

Roster

Schedule

|-
!colspan=9 style="background:#cc1122; color:#ffffff;"| Exhibition

|-
!colspan=9 style="background:#cc1122; color:#ffffff;"| Non-conference regular season

|-
!colspan=9 style="background:#cc1122; color:#ffffff;"| Big Ten regular season

|-
!colspan=9 style="text-align: center; background:#cc1122"|Big Ten Women's Tournament

Source

See also
2014–15 Wisconsin Badgers men's basketball team

References

Wisconsin Badgers women's basketball seasons
Wisconsin
Wisconsin Badgers women's basketball
Wisconsin Badgers women's basketball